TOMA is the local bus service in Caldas da Rainha, a medium-sized city in western central Portugal. Toma means "take this" in Portuguese, commemorating everyman figure Zé Povinho, whose image appears on the buses. Service was inaugurated by the Câmara Municipal (municipal chamber, or city council) on 15 May 2007, the municipal holiday.

System overview

TOMA service consists of three routes: Linha Azul (Blue Line), Linha Laranja (Orange Line), and Linha Verde (Green Line). The Blue line uses two minibuses and runs between the western and eastern ends of town. The Orange and Green lines each operate using a single twenty-nine-seat minibus on loop routes.

The Orange and the Green lines were inaugurated on 15 May 2007, as part of the first phase of TOMA service. In May 2008, the municipality announced TOMA's third route, the Blue Line, which serves the northern areas of the city not included in the two first-phase routes. The new route operates using two buses, rather than the single bus used by each of the other two routes. Introduction of the new line was delayed, because the company that won the bid to operate the line decided not to undertake the project after all. The municipality inaugurated the new route on 19 September 2009, Public Transport Day.

TOMA service runs from 7:30 a.m. to 7:30 p.m. on weekdays and from 8:00 a.m to 1:30 p.m. on Saturdays, with no service on Sundays.  All routes operate at 30–35-minute intervals, except for non-rush hour service on the Blue Line, which runs hourly.

Since 16 August 2011, a trip on TOMA costs €1.10 without a pass and €0.55 with a pass, called TTT – Título de Transporte do TOMA. Passengers receive volume discounts for purchasing multiple trips simultaneously.  They can also purchase passes for unlimited rides for given number of days. On January 9, 2008, the city council announced that persons in wheelchairs would ride free of charge.

Linha Azul (Blue Line)
On westbound trips, the Linha Azul (Blue Line) stops at:
 Mercado (weekly market/fairground)
 Belver (neighborhood)
 Hospital
 Cinco Bicas (fountain)
 Chafariz (fountain)
 Montepio (health organization)
 Câmara (city hall)
 PSP (police station)
 Quinta Canários/Avelar Couto (neighborhood)
 Quinta Canários/Hotel
 Hortas (factory)
 Cutileira (neighborhood)
 Centro de Saúde (health center)
 Centro Escolar Santo Onofre (school)
 Cidade Nova (neighborhood)
 Badajoz
 Expoeste (special events center)
 Raúl Proença (secondary school)
 D. João II (street)
 CAR Badminton
 Colégio (private school)
 Rugby

On eastbound trips, the Linha Azul (Blue Line) stops at:
 Rugby
 Piscinas (municipal pools)
 CAR Badminton
 Arneiros (neighborhood)
 Raúl Proença (secondary school)
 Expoeste (special events center)
 Badajoz
 Cidade Nova (neighborhood)
 Centro Escolar Santo Onofre (school)
 Centro de Saúde (health center)
 Cutileira (neighborhood)
 Hortas (factory)
 Quinta Canários/Hotel
 Quinta Canários/Avelar Couto (neighborhood)
 EB2,3 D. João II (middle school)
 Montepio (health organization)
 Heróis da Grande Guerra (pedestrianized downtown shopping street)
 Rainha (roundabout with statue of Queen Leonor)
 Praça da Fruta (main square, daily farmers market, official name: Praça da República)
 Hospital
 Univ. Católica (university)
 Colina do Sol (neighborhood)
 Santa Rita (neighborhood)
 Residências Montepio (senior housing)
 Gago Coutinho (crossroads in neighborhood)
 Mercado (weekly market/fairground)

Linha Laranja (Orange Line)
The Linha Laranja (Orange Line) is a unidirectional loop route which stops at:
 Rodoviária (bus station)
 Cinco Bicas (fountain)
 Hospital
 Univ. Católica (university)
 Encosta do Sol (neighborhood)
 Chafariz (fountain)
 Montepio (health organization)
 Heróis da Grande Guerra (pedestrianized downtown shopping street)
 Rainha (roundabout with statue of Queen Leonor)
 Bairro Azul
 Biblioteca (library)
 Cencal (ceramics school)
 Quinta dos Pinheiros 1
 Unid. Saude S. Onofre (health unit)
 Morenas
 Quinta dos Pinheiros 2
 Hortas Urbanas
 Rugby
 Piscinas (municipal pools)
 CAR Badminton
 Arneiros (neighborhood)
 Fonte Luminosa (fountain)
 Centro de Saúde (health center)
 Estação CP (railway station)
 Câmara (city hall)

Linha Verde (Green Line)
The Linha Verde (Green Line) is a unidirectional loop route which stops at:
 Rainha (roundabout with statue of Queen Leonor)
 Parque (park)
 Centro D'Artes (arts center)
 Avenal Escola (school)
 Avenal (neighborhood)
 Centro Paroquial (parochial centre)
 ESAD (Escola Superior de Artes e Design, art and design college)
 S. João de Deus (street)
 EBI (Escola Basica Integrada de Santo Onofre, primary and middle school)
 Morenas/Jardim Infância
 Bairro Rainha D. Leonor
 Morenas (neighborhood)
 ETEO (Escola Técnica Empresarial do Oeste, professional school)
 Ponte (bridge)
 Bairro da Ponte (neighborhood)
 Fonte Luminosa (fountain)
 Centro de Saúde (health center)
 Estação CP (railway station)
 Câmara (city hall)
 Rodoviária (bus station)
 Cinco Bicas(fountain)
 Hospital
 Chafariz (fountain)
 Montepio (health organization)
 Heróis da Grande Guerra (pedestrianized downtown shopping street)

References

External links
 TOMA on Portal Caldas da Rainha, the municipality's official web site.

Caldas da Rainha
Bus transport in Portugal
Transport in Leiria District